The 1984 NSW Building Society Open  was a combined men's and women's tennis tournament played on outdoor grass courts at the White City Stadium in Sydney, Australia that was part of the 1984 Volvo Grand Prix and the 1984 Virginia Slims World Championship Series. The women's tournament was held from 19 November through 25 November 1984. The men's tournament was held from 10 December through 16 December 1984. John Fitzgerald and Martina Navratilova won the singles titles.

Finals

Men's singles
 John Fitzgerald defeated  Sammy Giammalva Jr. 6–3, 6–3
It was Fitzgerald's 2nd title of the year and the 12th of his career.

Women's singles
 Martina Navratilova defeated  Ann Henricksson 6–1, 6–1
 It was Navratilova's 13th singles title of the year and the 99th of her career.

Men's doubles
 Paul Annacone /  Christo van Rensburg' defeated  Tom Gullikson /  Scott McCain 7–6, 7–5
It was Annacone's 1st career title. It was Van Rensburg's only title of the year and the 2nd of his career.

Women's doubles
 Claudia Kohde-Kilsch /  Helena Suková defeated  Wendy Turnbull /  Sharon Walsh 6–2, 7–6
 It was Kohde-Kilsch's 5th title of the year and the 11th of her career. It was Suková's 5th title of the year and the 6th of her career.

References

External links
 ITF men's tournament edition details
 ITF women's tournament edition details

NSW Building Society Open
NSW Building Society Open
Sydney International
NSW Building Society Open
NSW Building Society Open
NSW Building Society Open
NSW Building Society Open, 1984